Flowers is the twelfth studio album by Joan of Arc released in 2009 on Polyvinyl Records. The album was announced on March 13 for release on June 9. In addition, the album's track listing and artwork were revealed.

Track listing
 Fogbow - 4:07
 The Garden of Cartoon Exclamations - 5:05
 Flowers - 6:38
 Fasting - 2:10
 Explain Yourselves #2
 Tsunshine - 6:04
 A Delicious Herbal Laxative - 2:15
 Explain Yourselves - 4:11
 Table of the Laments - 2:28
 Fable of the Elements - 2:12
 Life Sentence / Twisted Ladder - 4:18
 The Sun Rose - 1:24

References

Joan of Arc (band) albums
2009 albums